Eftychia ("Effy") Vayena (born 1972) is a Greek and Swiss bioethicist. Since 2017 she has held the position of chair of bioethics at the Swiss Institute of Technology in Zurich, ETH Zurich. She is an elected member of the Swiss Academy of Medical Sciences.

Early life and education 
Vayena was born in Greece and grew up on the island of Lefkada. Vayena received a B.A. in history from the University of Athens, Greece and an M.Sc. in history of science, technology & medicine from Imperial College, University of London. Her master's research was on In vitro fertilisation where she examined the impact of new developments and the ethical questions. She then moved to the United States where she earned a Ph.D. in the social history of medicine from the University of Minnesota.

Career 
After her doctoral work, Vayena joined the World Health Organization (WHO) where she worked from 2000 until 2007. While there she led some of the organisation's work on the ethics of reproductive technologies. She returned to academia, joining the University of Zurich where she received her Habilitation in Bioethics and Health Policy. In 2015 she received a Swiss National Science Foundation Professorship Award and became assistant professor of health policy at the University of Zurich. IN 2017 she moved to ETH Zurich where she was later appointed professor of bioethics at Swiss Federal Institute of Technology, holding the first Chair of Bioethics of that Institution. She is a Visiting Lecturer at the Center for Bioethics at Harvard Medical School and a Faculty Associate at the Berkman Klein Center for Internet & Society at Harvard University, where she was previously a Fellow.

Bioethics 
Vayena is a specialist in the area of digital health ethics, health data governance, personalised medicine ethics, research ethics, ethics of genomics, health data governance and digital bioethics. She had focused on the normative aspects of independent oversight as well as the procedural principles that should guide independent oversight for digital health technologies. She chaired the WHO expert group that issued the “Ethical Considerations to guide the use of digital proximity tracking technologies for COVID-19 contact tracing” and in this role she considered the role of contact tracing during the COVID-19 pandemic.

Selected publications

Awards and honors 
She is an elected member of the Swiss Academy of Medical Sciences.

References

External links

Living people
1972 births
University of Minnesota alumni
Alumni of University College London
National and Kapodistrian University of Athens alumni
Bioethicists
People from Lefkada